Mingan, also known as Ekuanitshit in Innu-aimun, is an Innu First Nations reserve in the Canadian province of Quebec, at the mouth of the Mingan River on Mingan Bay of the Gulf of Saint Lawrence. It belongs to the Innu band of Ekuanitshit. Geographically it is within the Minganie Regional County Municipality but administratively not part of it.

It is serviced by a health centre, community radio station, library, cultural centre, community store, municipal water and sewer system, fire station, and an aboriginal police force.

The name Mingan, already appearing as mican on a map of 1631, is generally considered to originate from the Innu word maikan, meaning "timber wolf". But there is no certainty over this interpretation. It has also been proposed that it may have come from the Basque word mingain meaning "language", or the Breton term menguen that translates as "white stone".

History

Historically, the region was the homeland of the Innu people, who came there from their inland hunting grounds to spend the summer on the coast. Mingan was a summer gathering site where the Innu would fish for salmon, hunt for whale, have family meetings, and trade with each other. In 1661 the Mingan Seignory was granted and Europeans began to settle in the area, marking the beginnings of the fur trade, which continued until the early 20th century. The North West Company and then the Hudson's Bay Company (from 1807 to 1873) maintained trading posts there under the name Mingan, which were frequently visited by Innu to trade furs, although they continued to stay there during the summers only.

The Innu's nomadic way of life was disrupted during World War II, as mining and forestry companies moved into the area. After the war, mandatory education, fluctuating fur prices, and government housing programs led the Innu to settle permanently there.

On April 30, 1963, the Government of Québec transferred  of land in the seignory of Mingan to the Government of Canada to establish a reserve for the Mingan region Innu. The reserve however had no access to the Mingan River, which the Innu depended on for subsistence. After many years of struggle, the river banks were added to the reserve in 1983. In 1996, it was further expanded.

Demographics
As of 2022, the band counted 690 members, of which 635 persons are living in the community. Private dwellings occupied by usual residents amount to 153 out of a total of 164. Mother tongues spoken on the reserve are:
 English as first language: 0%
 French as first language: 5.5%
 English and French as first language: 0%
 Other as first language: 93.6%

Population trend:
 Population in 2021: 552 (2016 to 2021 population change: 0%)
 Population in 2011: 552 
 Population in 2006: 407 
 Population in 2001: 391
 Population in 1996: 431
 Population in 1991: 365

Education
There is only one school on the reserve, École Teueikan, that provides pre-Kindergarten to Secondary grade 4, and had an enrollment of 106 students in 2008–2009.

See also
 Innus of Ekuanitshit

References

External links
 Mamit Innuat tribal council - Ekuanitshit (Mingan)
Lower North Shore Community Web Site

Innu communities in Quebec
Communities in Côte-Nord
Hudson's Bay Company trading posts
1661 establishments in the French colonial empire